Qabr-e Mohammad (also Romanized as Qabr-e Moḩammad; also known as Qabr-e Moḩammad Morād) is a village in Zirtang Rural District, Kunani District, Kuhdasht County, Lorestan Province, Iran. At the 2006 census, its population was 152, in 24 families.

References 

Towns and villages in Kuhdasht County